Gamucha (Bengali: গামছা/গামুছা), also known as Gamosa or Gamchha, is a sort of traditional thin, coarse cotton plaid or turban fabric, sometimes with a checked design, found in east India, Bangladesh, as well as in eastern Terai of Nepal. It also became bit popular in other cultures of India and now in what is known as Pakistan after the Indian partition, as well as various parts of South and Southeast Asia.The word "Gamucha" is Bengali word which comes from two very simple and commonly used Bengali words, (গা) ga which means "Body", and (মুছা) mucha which means "wipe". Literally translated, it means 'something to wipe the body with' however, interpreting the word gamucha as the towel is misleading. It is often worn on one side of the shoulder. Its appearance varies from region to region, and it has been traditionally worn as a scarf by the Odia men and Bengali men. Gamcha is also a headwear for Bengali men especially rickshaw pullers in Bangladesh because it sokes all the sweats.  which was mentioned in Odia Mahabharata by Sarala Dasa. Male villagers wear it as a dhoti. Children of tribal communities in Odisha wear gamucha until their adolescence after which they wear dhoti. Weavers of traditional tantubaya or jugi community migrated from Bangladesh to Tripura and weavers of Odisha produce good quality gamucha. This is also used as turban and cotton towel in Punjab. They call it parna.

The gamucha is most commonly found with check and striped patterns of red, orange or green. Plain white gamchhas with coloured (embroidered or printed) borders from Odisha and Assam (for traditional Assamese Gamucha, see Gamosa) are local handicrafts, and may be worn around the neck with traditional Indian attire. In western areas, gamucha is primarily made in red colour and are plain like cloth. In southern India, gamucha is more coarse and are available in various dyes. Even homemade lightweight fur towels are also popularly termed as gamchhas. Gamucha are worn by the South Asian people, especially in the Indian states of Assam, Bihar, Odisha, West Bengal, Jharkhand and the Purvanchal region, because they are not as thick as Western-style towels and better suited to the country's tropical, humid climate. They may also be found in hamams as a traditional male loincloth and towel worn during bathing and massage.

Other uses

Cultural symbol 

Gamosa or Gamusa in Assam has a place of special use : it is given as a token of honour and respect to esteemed guest. In Bihu Dance male dancers wear it as a headscarf. The traditional Assamese dress is complete only when one wears a gamusa.

In Ahom King days, Ahom soldiers wife's used to weave a gamusa within a night and present it to her husband to ensure safety and victory.

Loincloth and headscarf 
Gamucha is also worn as knee long loin cloths by people of the poorer sections of society, especially menial labourers and farm workers. They are also used as a headscarf, similar to the Middle Eastern keffiyeh in rural areas.

Safety 
Gamchas can be turned into an effective weapon against wolves, leopards, wild dogs or feral dogs or even dacoits, by knotting a large stone pebble into one end and using it like bolas.

Face mask 
Farmers were already using it in rural areas for various purposes, Gamcha became an alternative cloth face mask in rural India. The WHO guidelines  for the necessary use of masks for protection from COVID increased its importance, and it became a choice of face masks by simply wearing on face. The need for this traditional piece of clothing has risen further since the Prime Minister of India made a television speech wearing Gamcha(a Manipuri gamcha, also known as Meitei Lengyan). It was trending since then in urban areas too.

Commercial aspects 
Gamucha is produced as a primary handloom product by traditional weavers. Presently the production of coarse handmade gamucha is slowing down in Odisha. A 1,455.3 metre long Gamucha displayed in Delhi created world record as it became world's longest hand woven piece of cloth.

See also
Agal, Arabian headdress
Gingham, scarf from Malaysia
Keffiyeh, traditional Middle Eastern headdress
Krama, Cambodian scarf
Tagelmust, scarf from Sahara
Turban, head scarf

References

External links

Indian clothing
Bangladeshi clothing
Hindu religious clothing
Turkish clothing